Yishay Levi, also translated as Ishay Levi (born January 20, 1963, in Rosh HaAyin, Israel) is an Israeli singer, specializing in Mizrahi music.

Biography
Levi was born into a family of Yemenite Jews. He began singing in clubs in Israel in 1983, when singers like Zohar Argov and Haim Moshe were at the peak of their careers. Here he was discovered by the guitarist Moses Ben-Mosh.

Levi produced his first album, Hafla With Ben Mohes in 1986. He became a superstar in clubs all over Israel. After this he released his first song in the album Ine Ba Ha-yom (Here Comes the Day); then the song "Raiya" brought him fame. It was at this time that he and Zohar Argov began a personal rivalry. The album was released in 1987.

Levi's career began to fade in 1988-1991 due to his drug habit. In 1992, he released the album Lehat'chil Mibereshit (To Start From the Beginning) with the hits "Rikdi" (one of the biggest hits in Mizrahi music) and "Mona." Later, Levi released the albums Ha-elam hamudot (Lovely Lad) in 1993, and Mabit mehatzad (Watch from the Side) in 1994, which were less successful, although the first album produced two hits, "Ha-elam hamudot" and "Mi li tomar."

In 1995 he released the album Bat almavet (Immortal). The entire album was a collection of Boaz Sharabi covers, except for the title song. This album was not a success and Levi's popularity started to fade again. Then in 1997, he released the album Ha-emuna (The Belief), which again saved his career as a singer with the hit "Taltalim shorim."

In 1997, he released the album  (Live at the Arena), but this was not a commercial success. In 2000, he released the album  (Face to the Future).

At the end of 2000, Levi was sent to jail because he broke into the apartment of his neighbor to steal electrical appliances so he could sell them to buy drugs. He was released from jail in 2003.

In 2004, Levi published the album  (Route of My Suffering). After this album, Levi did a show dedicated to his wife called  (I Sing for You, Iris). Levi was returned to jail after setting his wife's house on fire, apparently because she was not giving him money for drugs. He was released from this jail sentence in 2006.

In 2021, Levi told YNet television the following regarding the recent outbreak of violence between Israel and Gaza-based terrorist groups: "I want to tell Israeli soldiers and the government, don't stop until you finish the job."

New career boost
In 2008, Levi released the album Rikud romanti (Romantic Dance), which included the hits "Rikud romanti," "Roze Otach balayla" (I Want You at Night), "Isha namena" (Loyal Wife) and the Arabic hit "Ah ya albi" (Oh my Heart).

Ishay Levi is the brother of the Mizrahi musician and singer Nati Levi.

References

External links
"Rikud Romanti" video on Dailymotion
Ishai Levi songs transliterated at HebrewSongs.com

1963 births
Living people
Jewish Israeli musicians
Israeli people of Yemeni-Jewish descent
People from Rosh HaAyin